The 1981–82 season was Sport Lisboa e Benfica's 78th season in existence and the club's 48th consecutive season in the top flight of Portuguese football, covering the period from 1 July 1981 to 30 June 1982. Benfica competed domestically in the Primeira Divisão, Taça de Portugal and the Supertaça Cândido de Oliveira, and participated in the European Cup after winning the previous league.

In Baróti's second season, Benfica invests heavily to strengthened their choices of forwards, signing Fernando Folha from Boavista, plus the Yugoslavian Zoran Filipovic from abroad. However, the league campaign is disappointing, with Benfica losing three times before November. In other competitions, Benfica loses to 4–1 to Bayern Munich in the European Cup; the same result that Porto defeated them in the Supertaça. In the second half of the season, Benfica kept chasing Sporting in the title race, with the distance fluctuating several times, the shortest at three points, the longest at seven. In April, Benfica is knocked-out of the Portuguese Cup and a month later, loses the title to Sporting.

Season summary
Benfica started the new season as reigning champions, after Lajos Baróti led the team to their first league title in three years. Before President José Ferreira Queimado left his job, he signed a one-year extension with Baróti, something that new President Fernando Martins did not agree, claiming it left him with his hands tied. Toni became his assistant manager. In the pre-season, Benfica lost the aforementioned Toni to retirement, but invested heavily into forwards. To sign Fernando Folha from Boavista, Benfica had to outspent Porto and add Jorge Silva to the transfer. They also signed Yugoslavian striker Zoran Filipovic from Club Brugge. Other strikers approached but not signed were Pier Tol, Fernando Gomes, Sarr Boubacar, and Peter Houtman. The pre-season began on 28 July with medical tests and the presentation game with Boavista occurred on 4 August. Afterwards, Benfica competed in the inaugural Lisbon International Tournament and had a short tour for North America, competing in the Toronto Tournament. Due to the events of past season in a home match with Espinho, the first home match in the new season was played in the Estádio Nacional.

Benfica started defending their champions badge on 22 August in the Clássico with Porto, losing 2–1. They won their following three league matches, but were surprised by Amora, who defeated them on match-day 5. Before the end of September, Benfica was four points behind leaders Porto. Meanwhile, in the European Cup, Benfica had not problem surpassing Omonia in the first round. In October, Benfica's league performance remained poor, with another away loss in match-day 7, followed one week later, by a 1–1 draw in the Derby de Lisboa with Sporting. They were now in fifth place. The situation in Europe also degraded with Benfica losing 4–1 to Bayern Munich in early November and being knocked-out.In the Primeira Divisão, Benfica regained their footing with six consecutive wins before the end of the first half. Notwithstanding, they conceded another 4–1 loss, now for Supertaça Cândido de Oliveira with Porto and lost the trophy.

On 17 January, Benfica lost in Bessa with Boavista, finishing the first half of the league with 21 points, four behind leaders Sporting. A week later, Benfica beat Porto at home by 3–1, only to close the month with an away draw with Portimonense. The gap was now at five points. In February, another loss, 1–0 with Vitória de Guimarães, with Sporting increasing their lead to seven points. In the opening match-day of March, Benfica drops more points in an away draw with Estoril Praia, but Sporting had also drawn on the same day, so no changes occurred in the table. In mid March, Benfica won one-nil in the quarter-final of the Portuguese Cup in Estádio das Antas with an extra-time goal from Nené. A week later, they defeated Rio Ave and cut the distance to Sporting to five points, due to their rivals loss in the same match-day. The month closed with a decisive Derby between Sporting and Benfica, with the first winning by 3–1 in a hot game. In the second half, Manuel Fernandes inadvertently kicked Bento in the head, with the keeper responding by throwing the ball to his face. He was sent-off and a penalty signalled, with Rui Jordão making the 2–1. The gap between both teams was back at seven points.

On match-day 24, Benfica recovers two points in the title race, when Sporting loses to Portimonense and they beat Belenenses at home. A few days later, on 11 April, Benfica was knocked-out of the Portuguese Cup with a loss with Braga. The Primeira Divisão title reopened in the two last match-days of April. First on the 18, Sporting drops points at home, while Benfica wins, shortening the distance to four points. On 25 April, Benfica beats Braga at home, while Sporting drops points in Guimarães. The distance was now three points with four match-days to go. However, any hope of retaining the title was crushed when Benfica drew with Vitória de Setúbal on 2 May, while Sporting won on the same day. On 9 May, Sporting confirmed their league title, with Benfica eventually finishing the campaign with 44 points, two short of his rivals. Baróti was replaced Sven-Göran Eriksson at the end of the season.

Competitions

Overall record

Supertaça Cândido de Oliveira

Primeira Divisão

League table

Results by round

Matches

Taça de Portugal

European Cup

First round

Second round

Friendlies

Player statistics
The squad for the season consisted of the players listed in the tables below, as well as staff member Lajos Baróti (manager), Toni (assistant manager), Júlio Borges (Director of Football).

Transfers

In

Out

Out by loan

References

Bibliography
 
 

S.L. Benfica seasons
Benfica